Eleanor Grace Gehrig (née Twitchell; March 6, 1904 – March 6, 1984) was an American philanthropist, socialite, and memoirist, known as the wife of American baseball player Lou Gehrig. After Gehrig's death she continued to promote his legacy and contribute to Amyotrophic lateral sclerosis (ALS or Lou Gehrig's disease) research.
In 1976 she released her autobiography, My Luke and I.

She was born March 6, 1904, in Chicago, the daughter of Nellie (née Mulvaney 1884–1968) and Frank Twitchell. She had one brother, Frank. Eleanor stated in her memoir she was a product of the roaring twenties and during this time in Chicago she led a party-girl lifestyle while climbing Chicago's social ladder, eventually meeting Gehrig at party while he was in town for a game.

At the height of a storied career, her husband was forced to retire in 1939 due to his diagnoses with a little known disease at that time called Amyotrophic lateral sclerosis (ALS), which would eventually become known also as Lou Gehrigs' Disease. Gehrig died in 1941 from the illness at the age of 37. Eleanor traveled around the country with him during his baseball career and in his final years took care of him. In 1935, Eleanor produced a song with Fred Fisher titled "I Can't Get to First Base With You".

She took control of Gehrig's estate after his death. During World War II she raised money for the cause by auctioning off some of her husband’s memorabilia, raising six million dollars. She also registered to work with the American Red Cross Motor Corps. Then president Franklin D. Roosevelt heralded her for her efforts and summoned her to meet with him at the Little White House. Eleanor was sued by Lou Gehrig's parents, believing she had withheld income generated from his life insurance policy. The case was settled out of court. In the 1960s, she stopped an alcohol brand from using Gehrig's image for an advertisement, only wanting her husband's image to be used for the public good.

Gehrig served as National Campaign Chair on the board of the Muscular Dystrophy Association. Gehrig petitioned congress to provide funding for research on the disease and the creation and funding for a national institute on multiple sclerosis.

She was 80 when she died in 1984, never having remarried, and left no survivors, spending her life devoted to her husband and his legacy. She donated $100,000 to the Rip Van Winkle Foundation, which in turned formed The Lou Gehrig Society, whose mission is to support research for ALS and the legacy of the Gehrigs. She also donated $100,000 to Columbia University, which then established the Eleanor and Lou Gehrig ALS Center on the schools campus. Gehrig donated the remaining memorabilia in her possession to the National Baseball Hall of Fame and Museum. In 2003, journalist Sean Kirst published an essay titled "The Ashes of Lou Gehrig" which discusses Eleanor's concern over Gehrig's grave due to vandalism and her wishes to have her ashes mixed with his after her death.

Portrayal in media
Eleanor was portrayed by Teresa Wright in the 1942 film The Pride of the Yankees. The film was a hit at the box-office and was nominated for eleven Academy Awards. Eleanor served as consultant to the film and was paid $30,000 for her life rights. Teresa Wright was nominated for the Academy Award for Best Actress for her performance.

She has been portrayed on television in a 1943 Lux Radio Theatre production by Virginia Bruce and a 1949 Screen Directors Playhouse production by Lurene Tuttle.

In 1976, her autobiography was turned into a television film titled A Love Affair: The Eleanor and Lou Gehrig Story, with herself portrayed by Blythe Danner. The film was nominated for two Emmy Awards.

Works
  My Luke and I ,Thomas Y. Crowell Co.,1976

References

External links 

1904 births
1984 deaths
American philanthropists
20th-century American philanthropists
Businesspeople from Chicago
20th-century American memoirists
American socialites
People from Chicago
Burials at Kensico Cemetery